A gain graph is a graph whose edges are labelled "invertibly", or "orientably", by elements of a group G.  This means that, if an edge e in one direction has label g (a group element), then in the other direction it has label g −1.  The label function φ therefore has the property that it is defined differently, but not independently, on the two different orientations, or directions, of an edge e.  The group G is called the gain group, φ is the gain function, and the value φ(e) is the gain of e (in some indicated direction).  A gain graph is a generalization of a signed graph, where the gain group G has only two elements.  See Zaslavsky (1989, 1991).

A gain should not be confused with a weight on an edge, whose value is independent of the orientation of the edge.

Applications
Some reasons to be interested in gain graphs are their connections to network flow theory in combinatorial optimization, to geometry, and to physics.

 The mathematics of a network with gains, or generalized network, is connected with the frame matroid of the gain graph.
 Suppose we have some hyperplanes in R n given by equations of the form xj = g xi .  The geometry of the hyperplanes can be treated by using the following gain graph:  The vertex set is {1,2,...,n}.  There is an edge ij with gain g (in the direction from i to j) for each hyperplane with equation xj = g xi .  These hyperplanes are treated through the frame matroid of the gain graph (Zaslavsky 2003).
 Or, suppose we have hyperplanes given by equations of the form xj = xi + g.  The geometry of these hyperplanes can be treated by using the gain graph with the same vertex set and an edge ij with gain g (in the direction from i to j) for each hyperplane with equation xj = xi + g.  These hyperplanes are studied via the lift matroid of the gain graph (Zaslavsky 2003).
 Suppose the gain group has an action on a set Q.  Assigning an element si of Q to each vertex gives a state of the gain graph.  An edge is satisfied if, for each edge ij with gain g (in the direction from i to j), the equation sj = si g is satisfied; otherwise it is frustrated.  A state is satisfied if every edge is satisfied.  In physics this corresponds to a ground state (a state of lowest energy), if such a state exists.  An important problem in physics, especially in the theory of spin glasses, is to determine a state with the fewest frustrated edges.

Related concepts
Gain graphs used in topological graph theory as a means to construct graph embeddings in surfaces are known as "voltage graphs" (Gross 1974; Gross and Tucker 1977).  The term "gain graph" is more usual in other contexts, e.g., biased graph theory and matroid theory.  The term group-labelled graph has also been used, but it is ambiguous since "group labels" may be—and have been—treated as weights.

Since much of the theory of gain graphs is a special case of that of biased graphs (and much of the theory of biased graphs is a generalization of that of gain graphs), the reader should refer to the article on biased graphs for more information and examples.

References

Jonathan L. Gross (1974),  Voltage graphs.  Discrete Mathematics, Vol. 9, pp. 239–246.
J.L. Gross and T.W. Tucker (1977),  Generating all graph coverings by permutation voltage assignments.  Discrete Mathematics, Vol. 18, pp. 273–283.
Thomas Zaslavsky (1989),  Biased graphs.  I.  Bias, balance, and gains.  Journal of Combinatorial Theory, Series B, Vol. 47, 32–52.
Thomas Zaslavsky (1991),  Biased graphs.  II.  The three matroids.  Journal of Combinatorial Theory, Series B, Vol. 51, 46–72.
Thomas Zaslavsky (1999).  A mathematical bibliography of signed and gain graphs and allied areas.  Electronic Journal of Combinatorics, Dynamic Surveys in Combinatorics, #DS8.
Thomas Zaslavsky (2003),  Biased graphs IV:  Geometrical realizations. Journal of Combinatorial Theory, Series B, Vol. 89, no. 2, pp. 231–297.

Matroid theory
Extensions and generalizations of graphs